The James Madison–Richmond football rivalry is an American college football rivalry between the James Madison Dukes and the Richmond Spiders. Previously, it was a divisional game in the South division of the Colonial Athletic Association, and conference game in the Yankee Conference and Atlantic 10 beginning with the Dukes entry in 1993. During this period, the teams have combined for three National Championships (James Madison in 2004 and 2016, Richmond in 2008) and fourteen Conference Championships (James Madison in 1998, 2004, 2008, 2015, 2016, 2017, 2019; Richmond in 1998, 2000, 2005, 2007, 2009, 2012, 2015). All of James Madison's home games have been hosted at Bridgeforth Stadium in Harrisonburg, Virginia while Richmond hosted its contests at City Stadium until 2009, and from 2010 onward at Robins Stadium, both in Richmond, Virginia; as of 2016, only one game has been played on a neutral field, a 1985 matchup in Norfolk, Virginia. The rivalry has become increasingly intense over the years, likely due to the stark differences between the two institutions (Large Public School vs. Small Private School), and the continued success of both programs.

On October 24, 2015 the rivalry played host to ESPN College Gameday, as the show was broadcast from the campus of James Madison University before the two teams squared off. The result of the game was the highest scoring affair to date, with the Spiders beating the Dukes 59-49.

One interesting note in this matchup is the frequency with which the visiting team wins the contest. In the 27 games these teams have played as conference rivals, the visiting team has won 15 times, including 5 consecutive years from 1993–1997, 6 consecutive years from 2004–2009, and another 3 consecutive years from 2014–2016.

The two teams met again on September 29, 2018, marking the 27th consecutive season they have played as conference foes, and the 33rd consecutive season overall. James Madison, ranked #2 in the FCS, won by a score of 48–6. With the victory Madison took the all-time series lead, having won 19 of the 37 matchups between the two.

The rivalry will likely go on hiatus after James Madison announced it would elevate its program to Division I FBS for the 2022 season.

Game results

See also
 List of NCAA college football rivalry games

References

College football rivalries in the United States
James Madison Dukes football
Richmond Spiders football
1981 establishments in Virginia
College sports in Virginia
Sports rivalries in Virginia